The Dictation Lesson (in italian: Il dettato) is a painting of italian verismo painter Demetrio Cosola. The painting is housed in Turin Civic Gallery of Modern and Contemporary Art. It is a symbolic representation of the establishment of public education in the Kingdom of Italy immediately after unification, and the opening of schools to women, both as pupils and teachers.

Other versions of the painting

Cosola painted other two smaller versions of The Dictation Lesson (both oil on canvas): one dated 1890 without the teacher, ad a second one with a nun instead, titled The Kindergarten.

References

1891 paintings
Paintings by Demetrio Cosola